Dame Norma Christina Elizabeth, Lady Major,  (formerly Johnson; born 12 February 1942) is an English  philanthropist who is the wife of former British prime minister Sir John Major.

Early life
Norma Christina Elizabeth Wagstaff is the daughter of Norman Reuel Wagstaff, a Lieutenant in the Royal Artillery, and Edith Georgina Wagstaff (née Johnson), a former umbrella saleswoman. She was born in Shropshire while her father was stationed there during World War II. He was killed in a motorcycle accident a few days after the end of the Second World War, when Norma was just three years old, and her mother subsequently reverted to using her maiden name after becoming estranged from her in-laws, so she was known as Norma Johnson growing up.

Major was educated at a boarding school in Bexhill-on-Sea, Oakfield Preparatory School in Dulwich, and Peckham School for Girls where she was head girl. She was a skilled dressmaker. She was also a member of the Young Conservatives.

Marriage
At a Conservative Party meeting during the campaign for the 1970 Greater London Council elections, she was introduced to John Major. The couple married on 3 October 1970.

They have a son together, James Major, and a daughter, Elizabeth Major. She kept a low profile during her husband's premiership (1990–1997), doing charity work and writing two books, Joan Sutherland: The Authorised Biography (1994) and Chequers: The Prime Minister's Country House and its History (1997).

Charity work
In June 1999, Major was created a Dame Commander of the Order of the British Empire (DBE) in the 1999 Birthday Honours, in recognition of her charity work. Major is a supporter of Mencap, and she has been credited with helping to raise £6,000,000 for the charity.

References

1942 births
Living people
Alumni of London South Bank University
English biographers
English philanthropists
English women writers
Dames Commander of the Order of the British Empire
Spouses of prime ministers of the United Kingdom
Wives of knights
Women biographers